Blacktown railway station is located on the Main Western line, serving the Sydney suburb of Blacktown. It is served by Sydney Trains T1 Western Line and T5 Cumberland Line services and NSW TrainLink Intercity Blue Mountains Line and regional Central West XPT services.

History

Blacktown station opened on 2 July 1860 as Blacktown Road with the construction of the Main Western line.

Captain Martindale, the colony's chief engineer, was not happy with work done by contractor John Gibbons and refused to issue a certificate for work done. Not happy with the decision Gibbons told his men to remove three portions of the track near Parramatta. He was arrested and placed in the Parramatta Watch House before being released on bail. Two days later the first train ran into Black Town Road station. The station was renamed Blacktown on 1 August 1862.

The station received a major rebuild in the 1990s to a modern glass and steel structure with the addition of an extra platform and the provision of lift access to all platforms. It was opened on 14 October 1995 by Prime Minister Paul Keating. A bus interchange was also built in the triangle between the Main Western and Richmond lines. A pedestrian footbridge connecting the Richmond Line concourse with the main concourse area was also completed in 2018 therefore allowing passengers to be able to switch trains without having to exit the station.

Platforms & services

Transport links
Blacktown Station Bus Interchange

Stand A: Busways
752: to Rouse Hill station via Quakers Hill and The Ponds
WPSB: to Westpoint Shopping Centre
Stand B: Busways
753 to Doonside
756: to Mount Druitt via Woodcroft and Plumpton
Stand C: Busways
750: to Mount Druitt via Richmond Road and Bidwill
751: to Rouse Hill Station via Schofields and Marsden Park
754: to Mount Druitt via Glendenning and Hassall Grove
Stand D: NightRide
N70: Penrith station to Town Hall station
N71: Richmond station to Town Hall station
Stand E: Busways
728: to Mount Druitt via Bungarribee and Rooty Hill
729: to Mount Druitt via Eastern Creek and Minchinbury
Stand F: Busways
723: to Mount Druitt via Eastern Creek
724: to Arndell Park, peak hour extension to Huntingwood
726: to Doonside station
Stand G: Busways
721: to Blacktown Hospital
722: to Prospect Evening service combined with route 724
Stand H: Hillsbus
700: to Parramatta station via Prospect and Girraween
702: to Seven Hills
Stand J: Transit Systems Sydney
800: to Fairfield station via Polding Street
812: peak hours only to Fairfield station via The Horsley Drive 
Stand K: Hillsbus
705: to Parramatta station via Lalor Park and Pendle Hill
711: to Parramatta station via Seven Hills and Wentworthville
Stand L: Hillsbus
611: to Macquarie Park via M2 Motorway
630: to Epping via Seven Hills and Baulkham Hills
Stand M: Busways and Hillsbus (706 and 661)
706: to Parramatta station via Winston Hills 
744: to Blacktown Industrial Area
S7: to Parklea Garden Village Shopper Hopper
661: to Parramatta station via Kings Langley
730: to Castle Hill via Glenwood and Norwest Business Park
731: to Rouse Hill Station via Stanhope Gardens
732: to Rouse Hill Station via Acacia Gardens and Quakers Hill
734: to Riverstone via Schofields
735: to Rouse Hill
Stand N: Busways
743: to Kings Langley via Kings Park

Trackplan

References

External links

Blacktown station details Transport for New South Wales
Blacktown Station Public Transport Map Transport for NSW

Easy Access railway stations in Sydney
Main Western railway line, New South Wales
Railway stations in Sydney
Railway stations in Australia opened in 1860
Richmond railway line
Blacktown